Marko Marulić Splićanin, in Latin Marcus Marulus Spalatensis (18 August 1450 – 5 January 1524), was a Croatian poet, lawyer, judge, and Renaissance humanist who coined the term "psychology". He is the national poet of Croatia. According to George J. Gutsche, Marulic's epic poem Judita, "is the first long poem in Croatian", and, "gives Marulić a position in his own literature comparable to Dante in Italian literature." Furthermore, Marulić's Latin poetry is also of such high quality that his contemporaries dubbed him, "The Christian Virgil."

Marulić has been called the "crown of the Croatian medieval age", the "father of the Croatian Renaissance", and "The Father of Croatian literature."

According to Marulić scholar Bratislav Lučin, the notary of Split was well-versed in both the Christian Bible and in the Fathers of the Church. At the same time, Marulić also attentively read the Pre-Christian Greek and Latin classics. He read and interpreted Latin epigrams, wrote glosses on the poetry of Catullus, read Petronius' Satyricon, and admired Erasmus of Rotterdam. Marulić also composed epic works of Christian poetry, humanist elegies, and even satirical and erotic epigrams.

Although Marulić's writings in Renaissance Latin, once adored and envied across Europe, shared the destiny that befell most of Renaissance Humanist literature: they vanished into oblivion.

According to Lučin, however, the passage of time has slowly revealed the important web of influence that a single Croatian poet and writer successfully wove all over Europe and far beyond its borders. Marulić's writings were admired by churchmen such as Sts. Francis Xavier, Francis de Sales, Peter Canisius, and Charles Borromeo, by monarchs and statesmen such as King Henry VIII, Thomas More, and Emperor Carl V, and lastly by poets and humanists such as Jan Dantyszek, Conrad Peutinger, and Francisco de Quevedo.

More recently, Pope John Paul II quoted from a Marulić poem during his 1998 Apostolic Visit to Solin, Croatia.

Biography
Marulić was born on 18 August 1450 into the Croatian nobility in Split, Dalmatia. He was the first of seven children.  The palazzo in which he was born still stands on Papalić Street in Split.

His father, Nikola Marulić, was descended from the Pečenić family (Pecinić, Picinić, Pezzeni in Italian). Marulić came from a 15th century branch of the family whose founder was named Petar, and who only began calling themselves Marulić, Marulus or  De Marulis, in the 15th century. His mother, Dobrica de Albertis, was a member of the Italian nobility.

Very little is actually known about his life, and the few facts that remain are often unreliable. It is certain that he attended a school in Split run by the Italian Renaissance humanist scholar Tideo Acciarini (1430-1490). Marulić's education is known also to have included instruction in the Greek language by Hieronymus Genesius Picentinus. Although his library later contained many textbooks on the Greek language, Marulić is known to have read and spoken the language imperfectly and to have only rarely used Greek words.

After having completed school, Marulić is believed to have studied law at Padua University, after which he spent much of his life in his home town. 

Following a star-crossed love affair with a Split noblewoman, Marulić lived for about two years as a postulant at a monastery on the island of Šolta, in the Adriatic Sea.

After returning to Split, Marulić practiced law, serving as a judge, examiner of notarial entries and executor of wills. Owing to his work, he became the most distinguished person of the humanist circle in Split.

According to Franz Posset, Marulić aspired to the Renaissance humanist ideal: the uomo universale ("universal man"). To this end, he was interested in painting and drawing, local and national history, languages, and poetry. His overall goal always remained renovatio Christiana ("The Renewal of Christianity") and, like many other Renaissance humanists, Marulić denounced immorality among Roman Catholic priests and members of the Hierarchy in often violent language throughout his writings.

Marulić's Evangelistarium ("Evangelistary"), a moral and theological compendium of Old and New Testament texts, was first published in 1487. The book was later republished by Italian Jewish publisher Gershom Soncino at Pisa and a copy of that edition is known to have been purchased by the German humanist scholar and Hebraist Johann Reuchlin in 1492. In 1519, another edition of the "Evangelistary" was published by Sebastian Münster.

Between 1496 and 1499, Marulić worked on a compendium of Christian morality based on Old and New Testament examples and titled, De institutione bene vivendi per exempla sanctorum ("Instruction on How to Lead a Virtuous Life Based on the Examples of Saints"). The book was first published in Latin at Venice in 1507 and became well known in the Germanosphere when Adam Petri reprinted it at Basel in 1513. The same book was widely and repeatedly reprinted and translated in many different vernacular literatures: which established Marulić's fame throughout Europe.

Occasionally Marulić visited Venice (to trade) and Rome (to celebrate the year 1500).

Marulić is also known to have been a great admirer of the late Medieval religious movement known as Devotio Moderna. By 1509, Marulić had finished translating Thomas à Kempis' The Imitation of Christ, a highly important literary and devotional work of that movement, from Medieval Latin into the Croatian language. His translation, however, remained unpublished until 1989.

In 1510, Marulić wrote The Deeds of the Kings of Dalmatia and Croatia and Quinquaginta parabole ("Fifty Parables"). In 1513, he finished writing The Life of St. Jerome.

In 1514, Marulić completed Carmen de doctrina Domini nostri Iesu Christi pendentis in cruce ("Poem about the Teaching of Our Lord Jesus Christ Hanging on the Cross"), which in years since has usually been published as part of De institutione bene vivendi and which remains his most famous work of Christian poetry in Latin. 

In 1517, he finished his epic poem the Davidiad, which was considered lost for more than 400 years, only rediscovered in 1952, and published for the first time in 1954.

In 1518, he wrote De humilitate et gloria Christi ("On the Humility and Glory of Christ") and An Account of Illustrious Men of the Old Testament. 

Between 1520 and 1522, he wrote De ultimo Christi judicio ("On the Last Judgment of Christ") and Judita, Marulić's Christian work of epic poetry retelling the Book of Judith in the Croatian language, which later earned him the title, "Father of Croatian literature."

According to Marulić scholar Franz Posset, "He was interested in local and national history, being a collector of inscriptions from cities in Italy and Croatia. His overall goal remained the renewal of Christianity, as he admired Erasmus of Rotterdam. As a lay theologian, he became one of the great figures of European Renaissance humanism."

Marko Marulić died in Split on 5 January 1524 and was buried in the Church of St. Francis in the historic city center.

Legacy 
Marulić's Liber de laudibus Herculis ("A Book in Praise of Hercules"), in which he, "lets the followers of Hercules, the titan of the pagans, compete with the titan of the Christians, that is, Jesus Christ, who, of course, is ultimately the victor", was posthumously published in 1524. It is also known under the title Dialogus de Hercule a Christicolis superato ("The Dialogue about Hercules, Who was Surpassed by Those Who Worship Christ").

According to Franz Posset, even though Marulić and Martin Luther lived at the same time and were published by two of the same Basel printers, their collected writings make no mention of each other. Lacking new discoveries, it must be assumed that both theologians were simply unaware of the other's existence. At the same time, both men shared a common belief in Evangelica Veritas ("Gospel Truth") and "theology for piety". They also both built their theology upon the similar training they received in scholasticism, Renaissance humanism, and Devotio moderna. Like fellow Renaissance humanists Johann Reuchlin, Erasmus of Rotterdam, Thomas More, and John Fisher, however, Marko Marulić remained committed to an internal renewal of Roman Catholicism and loyal to the Holy See, while Martin Luther and his adherents did not.

At the same time, though, Marulić's writings were admired both by many of the greatest and most influential Catholic saints of the Counter-Reformation and also, as Marulić could be read without violating Sola Scriptura, by generations of believers in Protestantism.

For this reason, Marulić must now be considered one of the most dynamic and most influential theological and devotional writers of the Renaissance era.

During 16th and 17th century, Marulić's three most popular and most widely read works were De institutione bene vivendi per exempla sanctorum ("Instruction on How to Lead a Virtuous Life Based on the Examples of Saints"), Evangelistarium ("Evangelistary"), and Quinquaginta parabole ("Fifty Parables"). By 1680, these three books had been republished more than eighty times not only in the original Latin, but also after translation into many European vernacular languages, including Italian, German, French, Spanish, Portuguese, Czech, Flemish, and even Icelandic.

The British Library still has King Henry VIII's Latin-language copy of Marulić's Evangelistiarium, a book that was read in English and recommended to the King by Sir Thomas More. Extensive margin notes in the King's own hand prove that Marulić's book was a major source used by the King in the writing of his polemic against Lutheranism; Defence of the Seven Sacraments.

De institutione bene vivendi per exempla sanctorum ("Instruction on How to Lead a Virtuous Life Based on the Examples of Saints"), a voluminous book of Christian morality based on examples from the Bible and which concludes with the Latin poem Carmen de doctrina Domini nostri Iesu Christi pendentis in cruce ("Poem about the Teaching of Our Lord Jesus Christ Hanging on the Cross"). The book was first published in 1506 in Venice. 
The concluding poem, which remains Marulić's most famous work of Latin Christian poetry, was published separately in a standalone volume at Erfurt by the German Renaissance humanist and Cistercian abbot Henricus Urbanus in 1514.

De institutione is known to have influenced St Francis Xavier, and it was claimed by one of Francis' associates in 1549 to have been the only book that he carried with him and re-read during his missionary work. Further research, however, will be needed to determine whether excerpts from De institutione were translated into Japanese by Paul Yôhô-ken (1510-1599) and his son and published at Nagasaki by the Society of Jesus as Sanctos no go-sagyô no uchi nukigakkan dai-ichi ("Extracts from the Acts of the Saints") in 1591.

While imprisoned for Recusancy in the Tower of London under Queen Elizabeth I, St. Philip Howard, who was later Canonized in 1970 by Pope Paul VI as one of the Forty Martyrs of England and Wales, made a translation into Elizabethan English verse of Marulić's poem Carmen de doctrina Domini nostri Iesu Christi pendentis in cruce ("A Dialogue Betwixt a Christian and Christ Hanging on the Crosse"). Howard also made an English translation of John Justus of Landsberg's Alloquia Jesu Christi ad animam fidelem ("An Epistle in the Person of Jesus Christ to the Faithful Soule") during his imprisonment in the Tower, which was posthumously published at Antwerp, in the Spanish Netherlands (1595). St. Philip Howard's translation of Marulić's poem was published instead of a preface to the Antwerp edition and again, with updated English orthography, as part of the March/April 2022 issue of the literary magazine, St. Austin Review.

On October 4, 1998, Pope John Paul II quoted from Marulić's Carmen de doctrina Domini nostri Iesu Christi pendentis in cruce ("Poem about the Teaching of Our Lord Jesus Christ Hanging on the Cross") during an apostolic visit to Solin, Croatia, "One of your poets has written, Felix qui semper vitae bene computat usum ('Happy the one who always puts his life to good use.') It is vital to choose true values, not those which pass, to choose genuine truth, not half-truths and pseudo-truths. Do not trust those who promise you easy solutions. Nothing great can be built without sacrifice."

Currency and medals 
Marulić's portrait was depicted on the obverse of the Croatian 500 kuna banknote, issued in 1993.

Croatian state decoration awarded for special merits for culture, Order of Danica Hrvatska is ornamented with the face of Marko Marulić.

MARUL award 
Festival of Croatian Drama in Split, Croatia is named after Marulić 'Festival Marulićevi dani' (Festival of Marulić days) and gives annual MARUL awards.

Writing
The central figure of the humanist circle in Split, Marulić was inspired by the Bible, Antique writers and Christian hagiographies. Main topics of his writings were Christian theological by nature. He was a poet and writer who wrote many poems, discussions on theology and Christian ethics, stories and epic poetry. He wrote in three languages: Renaissance Latin (more than 80% of his surviving opus), Croatian and Italian (three letters and two sonnets are preserved).

Croatian works 

In the works written in Croatian, Marulić achieved a permanent status and position that has remained uncontested. His central Croatian oeuvre, the epic poem Judita written in 1501 and published in Venice in 1521, is based on the Biblical tale from a Deuterocanonical Book of Judith, written in Čakavian dialect – his mother tongue and described by him as u versi haruacchi slozhena ("arranged in Croatian stanzas"). His other works in Croatian are:

 Suzana ("Susanna") – a Biblical poem in 780 verses, based upon the account from the Book of Daniel about the Babylonian Jewish woman of the same name who was falsely accused of adultery and how her innocence was proven and how she was saved from death by stoning by the timely intervention and interrogation of her accusers by the Prophet Daniel.
 Poklad i korizma (Carnival and Lent), Spovid koludric od sedam smrtnih grihov ("A Nun's Confession of the Seven Deadly Sins"), Anka satir (Anka: A Satire) – secular poetry, and poetry dedicated to his sister Bira
 Tužen'je grada Hjerosolima (Jerusalem's Lament) – anti-Turkish laments
 Molitva suprotiva Turkom ("A Prayer Against the Turks") – poem in 172 doubly rhymed dodecasyllablic stanzas of anti-Turkish theme, written between 1493 and 1500. The poem has a hidden acrostic Solus deus potes nos liberare de tribulatione inimicorum nostrorum Turcorum sua potentia infinita, "Only God with his infinite might can save us from the misery of our enemies Turks", discovered by Luko Paljetak. The poem is believed to show the influence of Juraj Šižgorić's  Elegija o pustošenju Šibenskog polja and the Medieval song Spasi, Marije, tvojih vjernih from Tkonski miscellany. Marulić's poem in turn has influenced Zoranić's Planine – the first Croatian novel, in which ganka pastira Marula alludes to Turks, and also to Petar Lučić and his work Molitva Bogu protiv Turkom, and Primož Trubar's Pjesni zuper Turke.

American historian John Van Antwerp Fine, Jr. emphasizes that Marulić belongs to a group of humanists and clerics placed in the "Croat" camp who, at least at the time they wrote their texts, did not seem to have a Croatian ethnic identity.
It must be noted however, that a critical review of John Van Antwerp's work highlighted subjective conclusions. Neven Budak of the University of Zagreb  noted "ideological prejudices", "omission of historical facts" and "preconceived conclusions" due to John Van Antwerp's personal bias regarding former Yugoslavia and its various ethnic groups.

Latin works 
 
His European fame rested mainly on his works written in Renaissance Latin which were repeatedly re-published. 

He published Psichiologia de ratione animae humanae, which contains the earliest known literary reference to psychology. 

In 1517, Marulić completed the Davidiad an epic poem which retold the Old Testament story of King David in Virgilian Latin with multiple references to Greek and Roman mythology. 

In addition to the small portions that attempt to recall Homer, the Davidiad is heavily modeled upon Virgil's Aeneid. This is so much the case that Marulić's contemporaries called him the "Christian Virgil from Split." Serbian-American philologist Miroslav Marcovich also detects "the influence of Ovid, Lucan, and Statius" in the work.

Unfortunately, the Davidiad was considered lost by 1567 and remained so until Marulic's original manuscript (Ms. T) resurfaced at the Turin National University Library in 1922, only to have the news of its existence and the fact that it had never previously been published spread throughout Classical academia by Carlo Dionisotti in 1952.

The editio princeps was published by Josip Badalić of the Yugoslav Academy of Sciences and Arts in 1954, but this work "proved to be a failure," as whole verses were left out and many words were misread by the editor. Several years later, in 1957, Miroslav Marcovich overcame many of the difficulties that plagued Badalić's work and produced a more usable critical edition. Latinist Veljko Gortan eventually corrected around 50 instances of misread words and published his own critical edition in 1974. 

A literary translation of the Davidiad into Croatian hexameters was made by Branimir Glavačić and published facing the Latin original as part of Veljko Gortan's edition in 1974. 

Marulić was active in the struggles against the Ottoman Turks who were invading the Croatian lands at that time. To this end, he wrote a Latin Epistola to Pope Adrian VI and begged for assistance in the fight against the Ottomans. Also, in his epigram In discordiam principium Christianorum ("Against Discord between the Princes of the Christians"), Marulić denounced the Crowned heads of Europe for warring among themselves at a time when the Sultan of the Ottoman Empire and the Janissaries were invading Christendom.

Glasgow codex 

A recently discovered manuscript of Marko Marulić in the University Library of Glasgow throws a new light on his work and persona. It was discovered in 1995 by Darko Novaković and he states that in comparison with Marulić's known carmina minora the poems in the codex introduce three thematic novelties. Unexpectedly vehement, satirical epigrams are featured and the intensity of his satirical impulse is startling: even in such conventional poems as epitaphs. Three poems reveal his love of animals. The greatest revelation are the verses which show Marulić as the author of love poems. This aspect represents the most serious challenge to our traditional picture of the Poet: the last epigram in the collection is a true Priapeum marked with lascivious ambiguity.

Visual artist

According to Fisković, Marulić was an accomplished illustrator. In his will he left to his sister a book he illustrated and conceived. The second edition of Judita, prepared by Zadar publisher Jerolim Mirković, dated 30 May 1522 is adorned with nine woodcuts, the last of which is signed "M". It is assumed that the illustrations were created by Marulić himself.

In popular culture
 In the 2022 Netflix thriller film The Weekend Away, starting actress Leighton Meester and filmed in Split, the statue of Marko Marulić in Radic Brothers Square is shown during a pivotal scene.

Notes

References

Further reading

External links
 Marcus Marulus Spalatensis (site of the Marulianum, Centre for Studies on Marko Marulić and his Humanist Circle
 Vita Marci Maruli Spalatensis per Franciscum Natalem, conciuem suum, composita (Latin text and French translation)
 Marko Marulić, the "father of Croatian literature"
 Links to digitized old editions of Marulić's books
 Links to works about Marulić in English, German, Italian, and Spanish 
 Links to translations of Marulić's works in English, French, German, Icelandic, Italian, Portuguese, and Spanish
 Project VALMAR: Valorizzazione e recupero degli scritti e dei luoghi dell'umanista spalatino Marko Marulić/Marcus Marulus
 "Colloquia Maruliana" on Hrčak, portal of scientific journals of Croatia
 French translations of several works of Marulić
 Facsimile of the editio princeps of Judita, Venice, 1521
 Zadar edition of Judita with illustrations by Marko Marulić

1450 births
1524 deaths
15th-century Croatian people
16th-century Italian literature
16th-century Croatian poets
16th-century male writers
16th-century Latin-language writers
16th-century Croatian people
Catholic poets
Croatian male poets
Croatian people of Italian descent
Croatian Renaissance humanists
Christian humanists
Croatian Catholic poets
Epic poets
Mythopoeic writers
New Latin-language poets
Republic of Venice poets
Sonneteers
Venetian Slavs
Venetian period in the history of Croatia
Writers from Split, Croatia